Pavol Maľa (17 October 1910 – 21 October 1970) was a Slovak athlete. He competed in the men's javelin throw at the 1936 Summer Olympics.

References

External links
 

1910 births
1970 deaths
Athletes (track and field) at the 1936 Summer Olympics
Slovak male javelin throwers
Olympic athletes of Czechoslovakia
People from Zvolen District
Sportspeople from the Banská Bystrica Region